Operation Odyssey Dawn was the U.S. code name for the American role in the international military operation in Libya to enforce United Nations Security Council Resolution 1973 during the initial period of 19–31 March 2011, which continued afterwards under NATO command as Operation Unified Protector. The initial operation implemented a no-fly zone that was proposed during the Libyan Civil War to prevent government forces loyal to Muammar Gaddafi from carrying out air attacks on anti-Gaddafi forces. On 19 March 2011, several countries prepared to take immediate military action at a summit in Paris. Operations commenced on the same day with a strike by French fighter jets, then US and UK forces conducting strikes from ships and submarines via 110 Tomahawk cruise missiles and air assets bombing Gaddafi forces near Benghazi. The goal of coalition forces was to impose a no-fly zone for Libyan government forces.

Prior to that, an agreement to pass command of the arms embargo to NATO was reached on 23 March, and a handover of enforcement of the no-fly zone to NATO was agreed to on 24 March and became effective the following day. With the handover of coalition command to NATO, Operation Odyssey Dawn remained the name for the activities of U.S. forces, and the coalition's objectives continued to be carried out under Operation Unified Protector. However, NATO's objectives did not include aiding the rebel forces' efforts to take control of territory held by the government.

The British name for its military support of Resolution 1973 is Operation Ellamy, the Canadian participation is Operation Mobile, and the French participation is Opération Harmattan.

Command

The strategic command of Operation Odyssey Dawn was under the authority of General Carter Ham, the Combatant Commander of the United States Africa Command (AFRICOM), a Unified Combatant Command of the Department of Defense. Tactical command in the theater of operations was under command of Admiral Sam Locklear, the Commander of United States Naval Forces Africa on board the command ship USS Mount Whitney in the Mediterranean Sea. Vice Admiral Harry B. Harris, Commander, U.S. Sixth Fleet, assumed responsibilities as the Joint Forces Maritime Component Commander, also stationed aboard USS Mount Whitney along with Brigadier General Paul W. Brier, Commander, U.S. Marine Corps Forces Europe and Africa, as the Deputy Joint Forces Maritime Component Command. Major General Margaret H. Woodward was commander of US Air Force aircraft involved in the operation. On 21 March 2011, President Obama stated the U.S. military action would be scaled back soon and was considering handing over command of the operation to either France, the UK or NATO. On 24 March 2011, NATO took command of enforcing the no-fly zone in Libya and was considering taking control of the rest of the mission. On 24 March 2011, the coalition agreed to have NATO command the no-fly zone, and the U.S. Department of Defense stated that the U.S. would relinquish command of Operation Odyssey Dawn as early as 28 March.

Deployed forces

 Belgian Armed Forces
 Belgian Air Component
 Six F-16AM 15MLU Falcon fighter jets operating from Araxos Air Base, Greece
 Canadian Armed Forces
 Royal Canadian Air Force
 Total 440 military personnel deployed
 Seven CF-18 Hornet fighter jets operating from Trapani-Birgi Airport, Italy
 Two Airbus CC-150 Polaris air-to-air refueling tankers operating from Trapani-Birgi Airport, Italy
 Two Lockheed CP-140 Aurora maritime patrol aircraft operating from Naval Air Station Sigonella, Sicily, Italy
 Two CC-177 Globemaster III heavy transports
 Two CC-130J Super Hercules tactical transports
 Royal Canadian Navy
 Frigate 
 JTF2
 There are reports of members of JTF2 working with Britain's SAS and SBS on the ground in Libya.
 Danish Armed Forces
 Royal Danish Air Force
 Six F-16AM 15MLU Falcon fighter jets operating from Sigonella Air Base, Italy
 One C-130J-30 military transport aircraft
 Italian Armed Forces
 Italian Air Force
 Four Tornado ECR SEAD planes operating from Trapani Air Base
 Four F-16A 15ADF Falcon fighter as escort operating from Trapani Air Base
 Six EF2000 Typhoon fighter as air defence interceptor operating from Trapani Air Base (supporting the Italian contribution, but not under direct U.S. Command)
 Four AMX in the attack/reconnaissance role operating from Trapani Air Base
 Four AV8B Plus in the attack/air defence role operating from the Italian Navy aircraft carrier 
 Two MQ-9 drones operating from Foggia-Amendola Air Base
 One G222VS in the electronic warfare (supporting the Italian contribution, but not under direct U.S. Command)
 One KC-767A in the air-to-air- refueling operating from Trapani Air Base (supporting the Italian contribution, but not under direct U.S. Command)
 Netherlands Armed Forces
 Royal Netherlands Air Force
 Six F-16AM 15MLU Falcon fighter jets operating from Decimomannu Air Base, Italy
 One KDC-10 Tanker Aircraft
 Norwegian Armed Forces
 Royal Norwegian Air Force
 Six F-16AM 15MLU Falcon fighter jets operating from Souda Air Base, Crete
 Two C-130J-30 military transport aircraft supporting the Norwegian forces.
 Qatar Armed Forces
 Qatar Air Force
 Six Mirage 2000-5EDA fighters jets operating from Souda Air Base, Crete
 Two C-17 Globemaster III strategic transport aircraft
 Spanish Armed Forces
 Spanish Air Force
 Four EF-18AM Hornet fighters jets operating from Decimomannu Air Base, Italy
 One Boeing 707-331B(KC) tanker aircraft
 One CN-235 maritime patrol aircraft
 Spanish Navy
 AEGIS air defence frigate F-104 Méndez Núñez
 Attack submarine S-74 Tramontana
 Union Defence Force
 United Arab Emirates Air Force
 Six F-16E/F Block 60 Falcon fighter jets operating from Decimomannu Air Base, Italy
 Six Dassault Mirage 2000 fighter jets operating from Decimomannu Air Base, Italy
 United States Armed Forces
United States Navy
 , the command ship of the United States Sixth Fleet
 The Kearsarge Amphibious Ready Group, consisting of:
 , a 
 , an 
 , a 
 embarked 26th Marine Expeditionary Unit
 , an  guided missile destroyer
 , another  guided missile destroyer
 , a  nuclear attack submarine
 , a second  nuclear attack submarine
 , an  cruise missile submarine
 , a  oiler
 , a 
 , a 
 Five EA-18G Growler electronic warfare aircraft operating out of NAS Sigonella and Aviano Air Base
 One EP-3E ELINT aircraft
 Two P-3C Update 3 maritime surveillance aircraft
 Two P-3C AIP maritime surveillance aircraft
 United States Air Force
 Three B-2 Spirit stealth bombers operating from Whiteman AFB.
 Two B-1B bombers
 Ten F-15E Strike Eagle strike fighters operating out of Aviano AB, Italy
 Eight F-16C Fighting Falcon multi-role fighters from Spangdahlem Air Base started leaving for Aviano on 20 March
 Twelve F-16C Fighting Falcon multi-role fighters from Aviano Air Base
 Three E-3 Sentry airborne warning and control system (AWACS)
 Three E-8C battle management/command and control aircraft
 One EC-130H electronic warfare (communications jamming) aircraft
 One EC-130J psychological operations aircraft
 One RC-135V/W Rivet Joint signals intelligence aircraft
 Two AC-130U gunships
 Four KC-10A Extender Aerial Refueling Tanker/Airlift Aircraft
 Twenty KC-135 Stratotanker Aerial Refueling Tanker Aircraft
 Six A-10 Thunderbolt ground-attack aircraft
 Global Hawk unmanned aerial surveillance vehicle
 Lockheed U-2 Reconnaissance aircraft
 Predator/Reaper UAV
 United States Marine Corps
 Four AV-8B Harrier II ground attack fighters from the 26th Marine Expeditionary Unit, operating off of 
 Over 400 Marines of 1st Battalion 2nd Marines from Camp Lejeune, North Carolina deployed as the Air Contingency Battalion (ACB), on 1 March 2011 to serve as the new Battalion Landing Team for the 26th MEU. The ACB was attached to the 26th MEU on 5 March 2011 at NAS Souda Bay. This was the first time ACB has been used in almost a decade.
 Two MV-22 Osprey tiltrotor aircraft from the 26th MEU participated in the pilot rescue.
 Two CH-53E Super Stallions from the 26th MEU participated in the pilot rescue.
 One KC-130J Hercules from the 26th MEU participated in the pilot rescue.
 Central Intelligence Agency
 CIA Operatives gathering military and political information
 Defense Intelligence Agency
 DIA Operatives gathering military information

Summary of action

19 March
21h: The first main strike involved the launch of 112 Tomahawk cruise missiles from U.S. and UK ships against shoreline air defenses of the Gaddafi regime. The U.S. Department of Defense reports that the dismantling of Libya's ability to hinder the enforcement of the UN no-fly zone was only the first of multiple stages in the operation. USMC Harriers participated in an air strike against a large military convoy outside Benghazi.

20 March

Sustained anti-aircraft fire erupted in Tripoli at around 02:33 EET. Three B-2 Spirit bombers targeted 45 hardened aircraft shelters at a Libyan airfield near Sirte. At the same time, U.S. Air Force fighter jets conducted missions searching for Libyan ground forces to attack. U.S. Navy EA-18G Growlers jammed Libyan radar and communications. No U.S. aircraft were lost during the missions. The warplanes included Marine Corps AV-8B Harrier IIs (attacking pro-Gaddafi's ground forces), Air Force B-2 Spirit stealth bombers, and F-15E Strike Eagle and F-16C Fighting Falcon fighter jets. Admiral Mike Mullen, Chairman of the Joint Chiefs of Staff, states that there would be continuous allied air cover over Benghazi, and that the no-fly zone "is effectively in place". An EC-130J was recorded warning Libyan shipping "If you attempt to leave port, you will be attacked and destroyed immediately" in Arabic, French and English. Four Royal Danish Air Force F-16 flew their first mission over Libya

21 March
All fixed SA-2 Guideline, SA-3 Goa and SA-5 Gammon sites were taken out. Only SA-6 Gainful, hand held SA-7 Grail and SA-8 Gecko mobile SAMs were still a possible threat to aircraft. In the early hours of the day a building from Moammar Gadhafi's compound in Tripoli was completely destroyed by a cruise missile. Twelve more cruise missiles were fired at command and air defense sites.

22 March
At approximately 22:30 CET (evening of 21 March), a USAFE F-15E 91-0304 operating out of RAF Lakenheath (TDY to Aviano Air Base) crashed about 25 miles (40 km) southwest of Benghazi. Both crew members ejected at high altitude and were subsequently separated. A MV-22 Osprey, supported by two AV-8Bs, two CH-53E Super Stallions, and a KC-130J Hercules from the 26th MEU initially recovered the pilot, while the weapons officer was recovered later after being rescued by rebel forces in the area. Two Marine Harriers accompanying the rescue force dropped two 500 lb bombs at the request of the ejected pilot, prior to the MV-22 landing in an attempt to deter an unidentified group of people heading towards the area. The UK had a "peripheral involvement" in the rescue of the U.S. pilots.

Six local villagers, including a young boy, were reported to have been injured by gunfire from the rescuing U.S. forces, A Marine spokesperson aboard USS Kearsarge denied that shots were fired, saying: "The Osprey is not armed, and the Marines barely got off the aircraft. I was in the landing center the whole time, where we were monitoring what was going on, and firing was never reported", Pentagon sources were later reported to have confirmed that shots were fired, but the source of the civilian casualties is still being investigated.

Overnight, the U.S. bombed the wreckage of the downed F-15E "to prevent materials from getting into the wrong hands."

In a 24-hours period; 175 air sorties were conducted (113 US, 62 coalition). Around this time, the U.S. changed its target priorities from air defenses to Libyan ground forces.

24 March

Royal Norwegian Air Force F-16s were assigned to the U.S. African Command and Operation Odyssey Dawn. A number of Norwegian F-16s took off from the Souda Bay Air Base on the island of Crete, Greece for their first mission over Libya.

25 March
Three laser-guided bombs were launched from 2 F-16s of the Royal Norwegian Airforce against Libyan tanks. F-16s from the Royal Norwegian Airforce bombed an airfield in Libya during the night. Coalition planes flew 164 sorties and coalition leaders reported damage to Gadhafi's ground forces.

26 & 27 March
Lockheed AC-130 gunships and Fairchild Republic A-10 Thunderbolt II ground attack aircraft began operations, attacking ground forces. These were the first aircraft used against troops; previous strikes had targeted command and anti-aircraft infrastructure. Two B-1 bombers from Ellsworth Air Force Base attacked undisclosed targets in Libya.

Attack submarine  completed all assigned strike missions and left the area to return to its previous duties.

At this point in the mission, the U.S. was responsible for 80% of air refueling, 75% of aerial surveillance hours and 100% of electronic warfare missions.

28 & 29 March
On 28 March, a USAF A-10 and a USN P-3 attacked a Libyan Coast Guard vessel and two smaller craft after U.S. forces observed them firing into Misurata and at merchant vessels. The P-3 fired AGM-65F Maverick missiles at the patrol boat Vittoria, forcing the crew to beach her. The A-10 strafed the other two smaller boats with its 30mm GAU-8 Avenger cannon rounds, sinking one and forcing the crew to abandon the other. The  provided situational awareness for the aircraft by managing the airspace and maintaining the maritime picture.

31 March
From 08:00 EET, NATO took sole command of air operations over Libya under Operation Unified Protector, taking over from U.S. Africa Command. The four Danish F-16 fighters flew a total of 43 missions and dropped 107 precision munitions in operation Odyssey Dawn before transiting to NATO command.

Criticism

There has been criticism over the handling of the operation and the belief that the Obama administration failed to adequately consult the U.S. Congress. The Obama administration defended its handling of the Libyan crisis, drawing a clear line between military and political objectives. On 24 March White House Press Secretary Jay Carney told reporters "We are not engaged in militarily-driven regime change." Instead, the administration is engaged in "time-limited, scope-limited" action with other countries to protect civilians from forces loyal to Muammar Gaddafi. However, this conflicts with multiple statements seeming to imply regime change as at least one objective of the Operation, including a report made to Congress as required by House Resolution 292 :

Establishing these conditions would pave the way for a genuine political transition – of which Qadhafi's departure is a critical component. To bring about this objective, along with the international community, the United States responded to this crisis by developing, implementing, and monitoring sanctions and freezing billions in Government of Libya assets, building a broad international coalition focused on escalating diplomatic pressure on Qadhafi and increasing his isolation, and initiating and sustaining political support for military operations. ... Politically, U.S. leadership continues to play an important role in maintaining and expanding this international consensus that Qadhafi must step down, sending an unambiguous message to the regime. We continue working with the international community to enhance the capabilities of the Libyan opposition and increase the ability to achieve political transition. After many meetings with senior opposition members in Washington and abroad, combined with daily interactions with the U.S. mission in Benghazi, we have stated that the TNC has demonstrated itself to be the legitimate interlocutor of the Libyan people, in contrast to the Qadhafi regime that has lost all legitimacy to rule.

See also

 Operation El Dorado Canyon – 1986 U.S. air-strikes against Libya
 Operation Unified Protector – NATO operation for enforcement of UNSCR 1970 and 1973

Footnotes
Notes

References

External links

 Official Department of Defense Operation Odyssey Dawn page
 Operation Odyssey Dawn (Libya): Background and Issues for Congress by Congressional Research Service

Foreign intervention in the First Libyan Civil War
International security
Odyssey Dawn
Foreign policy of the Barack Obama administration
No-fly zone operations
2011 in the United States
United States Marine Corps in the 21st century
Libya–United States military relations

es:Operación Amanecer de la Odisea
it:Guerra civile libica#Intervento dell'Organizzazione delle Nazioni Unite